The bony-eared assfish (Acanthonus armatus) is a bathypelagic species of cusk-eel found in tropical and sub-tropical oceans at depths of from . It has been found as far north as Queen Charlotte Sound off British Columbia's coast. This species grows to a length of  SL.  It is the only known member of its genus Acanthonus.

The bony-eared assfish may have the smallest brain-to-body weight ratio of all vertebrates.

Like many other creatures that dwell in the depths of the sea, assfish are soft and flabby with a light skeleton. This is likely to have resulted from a lack of food and the high pressures which accompany living at such a depth, making it difficult to generate muscle and bone.

Etymology
It was described in 1878 by German ichthyologist Albert Günther, who gave the species its scientific name.  means "armed" in Latin, likely chosen because the fish sports spines off the tip of the nose and the gills. This also perhaps accounts for the "bony-eared" part, according to Gavin Hanke, curator of vertebrate zoology at the Royal British Columbia Museum.  is Ancient Greek for "prickly", and onus could either mean "hake, a relative of cod", Hanke says, "or a donkey". Adam Summers, associate director at the Friday Harbor Laboratories at the University of Washington, concurs, saying onus could easily read "as a homonym of the Greek word for ass".

References

Ophidiidae

Fish described in 1878
Deep sea fish
Taxa named by Albert Günther